Klaudia Hornung (23 January 1962 – 31 August 2022) was a German rower. She competed in the women's eight event at the 1984 Summer Olympics.

References

External links
 

1962 births
2022 deaths
German female rowers
Olympic rowers of West Germany
Rowers at the 1984 Summer Olympics
Rowers from Frankfurt